Dominique Ellen Dunne (November 23, 1959 – November 4, 1982) was an American actress. Born and raised in Santa Monica, California, Dunne studied acting at Milton Katselas' Workshop, where she appeared in stage productions. She made her on-screen debut with the television film Diary of a Teenage Hitchhiker, and thereafter played the recurring roles of Erica on the drama series Family (1980), and Paulina Bornstein on the comedy series Breaking Away (1980–1981).

Dunne's breakthrough came with the starring role of Dana Freeling in the horror film Poltergeist (1982), establishing her as a horror icon. She went on to headline the western film The Shadow Riders (1982), and portray Amy Kent on the crime series CHiPs (1982). Before her murder, Dunne was cast in the miniseries V (1983); however, she died midway through filming, and was replaced by Blair Tefkin.

On October 30, 1982, Dunne was strangled by her ex-boyfriend, John Thomas Sweeney, during an argument on the driveway of her West Hollywood home. She fell into a coma and died five days later on November 4, 1982. In a court case which gained significant media coverage, Sweeney was convicted of voluntary manslaughter in Dunne's death, and served three and a half years in prison.

Life and career

Childhood, education and family 
Dunne was born in Santa Monica, California, the youngest child of Ellen Beatriz "Lenny" (née Griffin), a ranching heiress, and Dominick Dunne, a writer, producer, and actor. Dunne had Irish and Mexican ancestry, her father was born and raised in an Irish Catholic family with her maternal grandfather an Irish-American and her maternal grandmother a Mexican who was from Sonora, Mexico. Dunne had two older brothers, Alexander "Alex" and Griffin Dunne, who is an actor and director. She was also the niece of married novelists John Gregory Dunne and Joan Didion. Her godparents were Maria Cooper-Janis, daughter of actors Gary Cooper and Veronica "Rocky" Cooper, and producer Martin Manulis. Her parents divorced in 1967.

Dunne attended Harvard-Westlake School in Los Angeles, Taft School in Watertown, Connecticut, and Fountain Valley School in Fountain, Colorado. After graduation, she spent a year in Florence, Italy, where she learned Italian. She studied acting at Milton Katselas' Workshop and appeared in various stage productions, including West Side Story, The Mousetrap, and My Three Angels.

Acting career 

Dunne's first role was in the 1979 television film, Diary of a Teenage Hitchhiker. She then got supporting roles in episodes of popular 1980s television series, such as Lou Grant, Family, Hart to Hart, and Fame. Dunne also had a recurring role on the comedy-drama television series, Breaking Away, and she also appeared in several other television films.

After her television appearances, in 1981, Dunne was cast in the supernatural horror film Poltergeist in the main role of Dana Freeling, the teenaged daughter of a couple whose family is terrorized by malevolent ghosts. The film was produced by Steven Spielberg and directed by Tobe Hooper, and served as her feature film debut. Poltergeist was theatrically released in 1982, which marks both her first starring role and her only appearance in a theatrical feature. It went on to become a critical and commercial success, becoming the eighth-highest-grossing film of 1982, and since its release it has acquired a cult following. She was set to reprise the role in the following installments of the franchise, but she died before production began on the sequels; Poltergeist II: The Other Side, filmed in 1985 and released in 1986, it explains her character's absence by stating that she has gone off to attend college.

Posthumous releases and unfinished projects 
Dunne appeared posthumously in the Hill Street Blues episode, "Requiem For a Hairbag,” which aired on November 18, 1982, only two weeks after her death. In the episode, she played a teenage mother who was a victim of parental abuse and chose to give her baby up for adoption, out of fear of repeating the cycle of abuse that she endured with her parents; due to an altercation with John Sweeney, her abusive partner, her bruises on screen were natural. The episode aired on November 18, 1982, 12 days after her funeral, and it was dedicated to her memory.

Dunne was cast in the miniseries V in 1982; she died during filming, so her role was portrayed by actress Blair Tefkin. According to series creator Kenneth Johnson, recovered footage of Dunne was used in a cameo appearance. The series was released in 1983, and is dedicated to her memory.

Relationship with John Sweeney 
Dunne met John Thomas Sweeney, a sous-chef at the restaurant Ma Maison, at a party in 1981. After a few weeks of dating, they moved into a one-bedroom house together on Rangely Avenue in West Hollywood. Due to Sweeney's jealousy and possessiveness, however, the relationship quickly deteriorated. The couple frequently fought, and Sweeney began to physically abuse Dunne. According to one account, during an argument on August 27, 1982, he yanked handfuls of her hair out by the roots. Frightened, Dunne fled to her mother's house, where Sweeney showed up and began to bang on the door and windows, demanding to be let in. Dunne's mother told him to leave and threatened to call the police. A few days later, Dunne returned to the home which she shared with Sweeney, and the two resumed their relationship.
 
During another argument at their home on September 26, 1982, Sweeney grabbed Dunne by the throat, threw her on the floor, and began to strangle her. A friend who was staying with the couple at the time heard "loud gagging sounds" and ran into the room where Dunne was being physically attacked. Dunne told the friend that Sweeney had tried to kill her, but Sweeney denied the claim and asked Dunne to come back to bed. She pretended that she was going to comply with his request but she snuck out of the bathroom window. When Sweeney heard Dunne start the engine of her car, he ran out and jumped on the hood of the car. Dunne stopped the car long enough for Sweeney to jump off the hood and then she drove away. For the next few days, she stayed with her mother and she also stayed at the homes of her friends. She later called Sweeney and ended the relationship. After he moved out, she had the locks changed and moved back into the Rangely Avenue home.

Death 
On October 30, 1982, a few weeks after Sweeney and Dunne broke up, Dunne was at her West Hollywood home rehearsing for the miniseries V with actor David Packer.  While she was speaking to a female friend on the phone, Sweeney had the operator break into the conversation. Dunne told her friend, "Oh God, it's Sweeney. Let me get him off the phone." Ten minutes later, however, Sweeney showed up at Dunne's home. After speaking to him through the locked door, Dunne agreed to speak to him on the porch, while Packer remained inside. Outside, the two began to argue. Later, Packer said that he heard smacking sounds, two screams, and a thud. Concerned, he called police, but he was informed that Dunne's home was out of their jurisdiction. Packer then phoned a friend and told him that if he was found dead, John Sweeney was his killer.

Packer left the home through the back entrance, approached the driveway, and saw Sweeney in some nearby bushes, kneeling over Dunne. Sweeney told Packer to call the police. When police arrived, Sweeney met them in the driveway, with his hands in the air and stated, "I killed my girlfriend, and I tried to kill myself." Sweeney later testified that he and Dunne had argued, but he could not remember what happened after their exchange. He claimed that he could only recall being on top of her, with his hands around her neck.

Dunne was transported to Cedars-Sinai Medical Center in Los Angeles, where she was placed on life support. She never regained consciousness. Over the following days, doctors performed brain scans, which revealed that due to oxygen deprivation, she had no brain activity. On November 4, her parents consented to have her removed from life support. At the request of her mother, Dunne's kidneys and heart were donated to transplant recipients. Her funeral was held on November 6 at the Church of the Good Shepherd in Beverly Hills. Her godfather, Martin Manulis, delivered the eulogy. She was buried in Westwood Village Memorial Park Cemetery.

On the night of Dunne's attack, responding officers found Sweeney standing by Dunne's unconscious body in her driveway. A spokesman for the West Hollywood sheriff later told reporters that Sweeney told officers, "I killed my girlfriend.” He was immediately arrested and charged with attempted murder. Those charges were dropped after Dunne's death, however, and subsequently, Sweeney was charged with first-degree murder, to which he pleaded not guilty. Sweeney was later charged with assault with intent to do great bodily harm when, during a preliminary trial hearing, he admitted that he and Dunne had a physical altercation on September 26, 1982, the day before she filmed the Hill Street Blues episode, in which she appeared with visible bruises on her face and body. He denied assaulting Dunne, however, claiming that she accidentally incurred the bruises when he tried to prevent her from leaving their home.

Trial of Sweeney

Beginning of the trial and arguments 
Sweeney's trial began in August 1983 and it was presided over by Judge Burton S. Katz.  During the trial, Sweeney took the stand in his own defense. He testified that he had not intended to harm Dunne the night he arrived at her home. He claimed that they had reconciled, that they were planning to move back in together, and that the two had daily discussions about getting married and having children. On the night of October 30, Sweeney said that Dunne had abruptly changed her mind about a reconciliation, however, telling him that she had been leading him on and lying to him about getting back together. At that point, Sweeney said that he, "exploded and lunged toward her." Sweeney claimed to have no recollection of attacking Dunne until he discovered that he was on top of her, with his hands around her neck. He then realized that she was not breathing. Sweeney said that he attempted to revive her by making her walk around, but she fell down. He then attempted to give her CPR, which caused Dunne to vomit. Sweeney said that he also vomited, ran into Dunne's house, and consumed two bottles of pills, in an attempt to kill himself. He then returned to the driveway, where he laid down beside Dunne, waiting for the pills to take effect. Sweeney's court-appointed attorney, Michael Adelson, argued that his client's actions were neither premeditated nor were they executed with malice. Instead, he maintained that Sweeney, provoked by Dunne's alleged deception, acted in the "heat of passion.”

Dunne's family disputed Sweeney's claim that she had reconciled with him, however. They insisted that he went to Dunne's home on October 30 in an effort to persuade her to reconcile after she told him that their break up was permanent. The prosecution and the police investigators also dismissed Sweeney's version of events, because there was no physical evidence that he had consumed pills in an attempt to commit suicide at the time of his arrest. Upon their arrival, the police said that they found Sweeney's demeanor to be both “calm and collected". Deputy Frank DeMilio, the first officer to arrive on the scene, testified that Sweeney told him, "Man, I blew it. I killed her. I didn't think I choked her that hard, but I don't know, I just kept on choking her. I just lost my temper and blew it again." The medical examiner who performed Dunne's autopsy determined that the victim had been strangled for at least three minutes. Given the results of the autopsy, the police and prosecutors dismissed the defense's argument that Sweeney acted unconsciously, however, because they concluded that, in the three minutes in which Sweeney strangled the victim, he had ample opportunities to regain control of his actions, which might have saved Dunne's life.

To establish a history of Sweeney's violent behavior, the prosecution called one of Sweeney's ex-girlfriends, Lillian Pierce, and asked her to testify. Pierce, who, at the request of Sweeney's attorney, did not testify in the jury's presence, stated that she and Sweeney had dated on and off from 1977 to 1980. Pierce claimed that during the relationship, Sweeney had assaulted her on ten separate occasions, and as a result, she was hospitalized twice for the injuries which she sustained. During one of the assaults, Pierce sustained a perforated eardrum and a collapsed lung. She later sustained a broken nose.

During Pierce's testimony, Sweeney became enraged, jumped up from his seat, and ran towards the door leading to the judge's chambers. He was subdued by two bailiffs and four armed guards. Sweeney was then handcuffed to his chair and began to cry. He apologized to the court for the outburst, which Judge Katz accepted. Attorney Michael Adelson requested that Judge Katz rule Pierce's testimony inadmissible, because it was "prejudicial.” Judge Katz granted the request, and the jury only learned about Pierce's testimony after the trial. Katz also refused to allow testimony from Dunne's mother, Ellen Dunne, as well as Dunne's friends, citing their statements about Sweeney's abusive nature as hearsay.

On August 29, defense attorney Michael Adelson also requested that Judge Katz rule that the court lacked sufficient evidence to try Sweeney on the charge of first-degree murder, because predetermination was not established. Judge Katz granted the request, and as such, the jurors were instructed to consider the charges of manslaughter or second-degree murder. Deputy District Attorney Steven Barshop later said that this decision, along with Judge Katz's previous rulings barring the testimonies of both Sweeney's ex-girlfriend and Dunne's mother and friends, seriously undermined the prosecution's case against Sweeney.

Verdict and sentencing 
On September 21, 1983, after eight days of deliberation, the jury acquitted John Sweeney of second-degree murder but found him guilty of the lesser charge of voluntary manslaughter. He was also convicted of misdemeanor assault for the altercation with Dunne that occurred on September 26, 1982.

Dunne's family was outraged by the verdict, calling it an "injustice". After Judge Katz excused the jury and commented on the judicial system being upheld, Dominick Dunne, the victim's father, yelled, "Not for our family, Judge Katz!" Before he left the courtroom, Dominick Dunne accused Judge Katz of purposely withholding Sweeney's ex-girlfriend's testimony from the jury, which would have established his violent history with women.

Victims for Victims, a victims' rights group which was founded by actress Theresa Saldana, protested against the verdict by staging a march outside the courthouse. Afterward, several media outlets also debated the events of the trial and the verdict. Several outlets criticized Judge Katz's rulings, which many argued were preferential towards the defense. One local Los Angeles television station polled viewers who rated Judge Katz the fourth worst judge in Los Angeles County.

On November 7, Sweeney was sentenced to six years in prison for manslaughter, which was the maximum sentence which he could have received, with an additional six months for the assault charge. At Sweeney's sentencing, Judge Katz criticized the jury's verdict of manslaughter, stating that he felt that Dunne's death was "A case, pure and simple, of murder. Murder with malice". The jury's foreman, Paul Speigel, later told the media that both he and his fellow jurors were surprised by Judge Katz's criticism and he called his comment "a cheap shot.” Speigel felt that Judge Katz's criticism did not stem from their verdict but from the harsh criticism he received afterward. Speigel went on to say that had the jury been provided with the opportunity to hear all of the evidence, it would have convicted Sweeney of murder.

Aftermath 
On the advice of Tina Brown, Dominick Dunne kept a journal throughout the trial. His journal writings were later published in an article titled "Justice: A Father's Account of the Trial of his Daughter's Killer,” which was featured in the March 1984 issue of Vanity Fair.

Shortly after the trial, Judge Burton S. Katz, who presided over the case, transferred to the Juvenile Court in Sylmar, Los Angeles. He later admitted that some of his controversial rulings in Dunne's case "pained" him, but he reiterated his thought that Sweeney should have been convicted of murder and given a lengthier sentence.

A year after her daughter's death, Dominique's mother, Ellen "Lenny" Dunne, founded Justice for Homicide Victims, a victim's rights advocacy group.

After the trial, John Sweeney was incarcerated in a medium-security prison in Susanville, California. He was released on parole in September 1986, after serving only three years, seven months and 27 days of his six and a half year sentence.

After his release, Sweeney was hired as head chef at an upscale restaurant in Santa Monica, California. After he discovered where Sweeney was working, Dunne's brother, Griffin, and her mother, Lenny, stood outside the restaurant, where they handed flyers out to patrons, the flyers read, "The food you will eat tonight was cooked by the hands that killed Dominique Dunne." Sweeney eventually quit his job, due to the protests which were staged by Dunne's family, and he moved out of Los Angeles.

In the mid-1990s, Dominick Dunne was contacted by a Florida physician who came across an article which Dunne wrote about Dominique's death. The doctor informed Dunne that his daughter had recently become engaged to a chef who went by the name of John Sweeney and inquired if that man was the same man who was responsible for Dominique's death. The man was later identified as the same John Sweeney, and in an effort to protect the young woman who was now engaged to John Sweeney, Dunne's brother, Griffin, contacted the woman and asked her to reconsider her decision.

Subsequently, Sweeney accused the Dunnes of harassing him, and in an effort to avoid further altercations, he changed his name. In later interviews in which Dominick Dunne discussed his daughter's murder, the writer shared that, for a time, he employed the services of private investigator Anthony Pellicano and asked him to follow Sweeney and report on his actions and whereabouts.  According to Dunne's father, Pellicano reported that Sweeney had moved to the Pacific Northwest, assumed the name John Maura, and continued to work as a chef. Later, Dunne's father said that he decided that he no longer wished to squander his life by following Sweeney, and as a result of his decision, he discontinued all of his attempts to maintain his knowledge of Sweeney's whereabouts.

Filmography

See also

The Poltergeist curse

Footnotes

References

External links
 

Justice for Homicide Victims - The official site of the victim's rights organization founded by Dominique's mother in 1984
"Justice: A Father's Account Of the Trial Of His Daughter's Killer" by Dominick Dunne at Vanityfair.com

1959 births
1982 deaths
1982 murders in the United States
20th-century American actresses
Actresses from Santa Monica, California
American expatriates in Italy
American film actresses
American stage actresses
American television actresses
Burials at Westwood Village Memorial Park Cemetery
Deaths by strangulation in the United States
Female murder victims
Harvard-Westlake School alumni
People murdered in California
People murdered in Los Angeles
Taft School alumni
Violence against women in the United States
American people of Irish descent
American people of Mexican descent
American actresses of Mexican descent